Romallo is a comune (municipality) in Trentino in the northern Italian region Trentino-Alto Adige/Südtirol, located about  north of Trento.

Romallo borders the following municipalities: Revò, Cloz, Dambel and Sanzeno.

Demographic evolution

References

Cities and towns in Trentino-Alto Adige/Südtirol